The Usos (born August 22, 1985) are an American professional wrestling tag team composed of twin brothers Joshua Samuel Fatu and Jonathan Solofa Fatu, who are known professionally by their respective ring names, Jey Uso and Jimmy Uso. They are currently signed to WWE, where they perform on the SmackDown brand and are the current Undisputed WWE Tag Team Champions, holding both the Raw Tag Team Championship in their third reign and the SmackDown Tag Team Championship in their fifth reign, which is the longest reign for the latter at + days and the longest tag team title reign in WWE history. They  are also part of a stable called The Bloodline which is led by their real life cousin, Roman Reigns, and also includes their younger brother, Solo Sikoa, with all being members of the renowned Anoa'i family of Samoan wrestlers.

Trained since childhood by their father, WWE Hall of Famer Rikishi, the team debuted in WWE's then-developmental territory Florida Championship Wrestling (FCW) in 2009, where they became FCW Florida Tag Team Champions. They were moved to the main roster the following year. While on the main roster, they have been managed by their cousin Tamina Snuka and Jimmy's wife, Naomi.

The Usos are considered by peers and critics to be one of the best professional wrestling tag teams in the world, and one of the best in WWE history. They are overall eight-time tag team champions in WWE, capturing the WWE (Raw) Tag Team Championship three times and winning the Slammy Award for Tag Team of the Year in both 2014 and 2015. In 2017, they won the SmackDown Tag Team Championship on three occasions, followed by a fourth reign in 2019 and a fifth reign in 2021. They are the first team to win both the Raw and SmackDown Tag Team Championships and the only team to hold them simultaneously.

Early lives 
Joshua Samuel Fatu (Josh) and Jonathan Solofa Fatu (Jon) were born in San Francisco, California on August 22, 1985 (Jonathan is the older twin by 9 minutes), the sons of Talisua Fuavai and professional wrestler Solofa Fatu Jr. The Fatu brothers are of Samoan descent. As the sons of WWE Hall of Famer Solofa Fatu Jr. (Rikishi), they are also part of the Anoaʻi family; they are first cousins once-removed from current and former WWE performers Afa Anoa'i Jr. The brothers attended Escambia High School in Pensacola, Florida, where they played competitive football. They continued their football careers at University of West Alabama, where they both played linebacker. Jonathan played one season (2003), while Joshua played from 2003 to 2005. On the January 26, 2007 episode of WWE SmackDown, Jon wrestled under the name "Jon Robinson" teaming with Chris Evans in a losing effort to Deuce 'n Domino.

Professional wrestling career

World Wrestling Entertainment/WWE

Florida Championship Wrestling (2009–2010) 
Jonathan, under the ring name "Jimmy Uso", appeared at the Florida Championship Wrestling (FCW) television tapings on November 5, 2009, accompanying Donny Marlow to the ring. Jimmy also appeared in a dark match prior to the FCW television tapings on November 19, defeating Titus O'Neil.

The Uso Brothers, with Joshua debuting as "Jules Uso", began 2010 by defeating The Rotundo Brothers (Duke and Bo) on January 14. In a clash of the generational wrestlers on February 18, The Rotundo Brothers teamed up with Wes Brisco to defeat The Usos and Donny Marlow. They continued their association with Marlow at the television tapings on February 25, when he accompanied them to ringside for a victory against Titus O'Neil and Big E Langston. In March they were joined by Sarona Snuka, who began acting as their manager and on March 13, The Usos defeated The Fortunate Sons (Joe Hennig and Brett DiBiase) to win the FCW Florida Tag Team Championship. They made their first title defense at the March 18 television tapings by defeating The Dudebusters (Trent Baretta and Caylen Croft) to retain. They went on to successfully defend the championship against Percy Watson and Darren Young, Hunico and Tito Nieves, Skip Sheffield and Darren Young, and The Dudebusters, who they defeated by disqualification when Tamina pulled the referee out of the ring to stop him from counting the pinfall. On June 3, The Usos lost the Florida Tag Team Championship to "Los Aviadores" (Hunico and Dos Equis).

Main roster debut and first feuds (2010–2013) 

On the May 24, 2010, episode of Raw, The Usos (with Jules now wrestling as Jey Uso) and Tamina made their debut as heels by attacking the Unified WWE Tag Team Champions, The Hart Dynasty (Tyson Kidd, David Hart Smith, and Natalya). The following week, Raw General Manager Bret Hart stated that he had signed them to contracts. That night, the trio cut a promo, stating that they were looking for respect for their families. They were interrupted and attacked by The Hart Dynasty, who were seeking revenge for the surprise attack the previous week. The Usos attempted to attack The Hart Dynasty again on the June 7 episode of Raw, but The Harts were ready and gained the upper hand. The Usos made their in-ring debut for the brand on the June 17 episode of Superstars, defeating Goldust and Mark Henry. Three days later they made their pay-per-view debut by losing to The Hart Dynasty in a six-person mixed tag team match at Fatal 4-Way. The Usos were scheduled to face The Hart Dynasty on the June 28 episode of Raw, but the match never started as The Usos instead attacked The Harts when they were entering the ring. The Usos defeated The Hart Dynasty for the first time in a six-person mixed tag team match on the July 12 episode of Raw when Jey pinned Smith. The Usos challenged The Harts for the Unified Tag Team Championship at the Money in the Bank pay-per-view, but were unsuccessful. On the July 26 episode of Raw, Jey Uso went against Randy Orton in his first singles match on the brand in a losing effort. They received another shot for the Tag Team Championship at Night of Champions in a Tag Team Turmoil match, where they eliminated both The Hart Dynasty and the team of Vladimir Kozlov and Santino Marella before being eliminated by Mark Henry and Evan Bourne. On the December 6 episode of Raw, The Usos were in a fatal four-way tag match and were eliminated, but Tamina stayed in the corner of Marella and Kozlov upon their winning of the WWE Tag Team Championship; as a result, she turned face and left The Usos.

On April 26, 2011, both Usos were drafted to the SmackDown brand as part of the 2011 Supplemental Draft. On the June 2 episode of Superstars, The Usos turned face when they competed against The Corre (Justin Gabriel and Heath Slater) in a losing effort. Throughout June 2011, The Usos continuous to complete victories with Gabriel and Slater in tag team matches, while managing to defeat them in two six-man tag matches while partnering once with Ezekiel Jackson and once with Trent Barreta. The Usos began performing the Siva Tau, a traditional Samoan war dance, as part of their ring entrance, using the dance to display their strength and energize themselves. They performed this entrance until they turned heel in 2016. On the July 29 episode of SmackDown, The Usos challenged David Otunga and Michael McGillicutty for the WWE Tag Team Titles, but were defeated.

The Usos then began appearing on the fifth season of NXT in September 2011, by delivering post-match attacks on the team of Darren Young and JTG. The Usos then went on to defeat Young and JTG on the September 27 episode of NXT Redemption. However, just like how The Usos debuted on NXT, they were attacked after their win by another debuting tag team, Curt Hawkins and Tyler Reks, and The Usos were defeated by Hawkins and Reks the next week. In the following months and into 2012, The Usos exchanged wins with Hawkins and Reks on NXT, while continually losing to Primo and Epico on SmackDown. They also feuded with JTG, who had become Tamina's boyfriend. In March 2012, The Usos began a feud with Darren Young and Titus O'Neil, after they mocked The Usos' pre-match Siva Tau. Although The Usos beat Young and O'Neil in tag team matches, they were continually defeated in singles matches. On the final episode of the fifth season of NXT on June 13, The Usos defeated Johnny Curtis and Michael McGillicutty.

The Usos then started a feud with The Ascension (Conor O'Brian and Kenneth Cameron) on the August 15 episode of NXT, with a match between the two tag teams ending in the Ascension being disqualified; the Ascension then conducted a post-match attack on The Usos. On the August 29 episode of NXT, The Usos called out the Ascension, but the Ascension ambushed The Usos and again delivered a beatdown. On the September 5 episode of NXT, the Ascension defeated The Usos. The Usos then teamed with Richie Steamboat to lose to The Ascension and Kassius Ohno on the October 17 episode of NXT. The Usos' feud with the Ascension was cut short when Cameron was released from WWE.

At WrestleMania XXVIII, The Usos unsuccessfully challenged for the WWE Tag Team Championship in a triple threat dark match against champions Primo and Epico and Tyson Kidd and Justin Gabriel when the defending champions retained their titles. At No Way Out, The Usos competed with Primo and Epico, Justin Gabriel and Tyson Kidd, and The Prime Time Players in a Fatal-4-Way Tag Team match to determine the Number 1 contenders for the WWE Tag Team Champions and were unsuccessful. On the July 16 episode of Raw, The Usos made an appearance dancing with their father, Rikishi, after Rikishi made a "Blast from the Past" return defeating Heath Slater. On the September 7 episode of SmackDown, The Usos were unsuccessful in winning a Triple Threat Tag Team match for No# 1 contendership for the WWE Tag Team titles against The Prime Time Players, and Primo and Epico.

WWE Tag Team Champions (2013–2015) 

On the June 3 episode of Raw, The Usos began to use face paint similar to their deceased uncle Eddie Fatu, also known as Umaga, as a means of further highlighting their Samoan culture. During the following months, they competed for The Shield's WWE Tag Team Championship. At Money in the Bank The Usos challenged Rollins and Reigns for the titles, but were unsuccessful and participated in a Triple threat tag team match against the team of Cody Rhodes and Goldust and The Shield at the Hell in a Cell pay per view, which they failed to win.

The Usos were involved in the traditional Survivor Series elimination match at Survivor Series, teaming with Rey Mysterio, Cody Rhodes and Goldust in a losing effort against The Real Americans and The Shield. After a brief feud against The Wyatt Family, at the beginning of 2014, The Usos would go on a winning streak and began to demand a Tag Team Championship match from The New Age Outlaws. They received a tag title shot at the Elimination Chamber PPV against the Outlaws but were once again unsuccessful, but they won the titles on the March 3 episode of Raw. On the WrestleMania XXX pre-show, The Usos successfully defended their titles in a Fatal Four Way Elimination match against Ryback and Curtis Axel, The Real Americans, and Los Matadores. The Usos then resumed a rivalry with The Wyatt Family, successfully retaining the championships against Harper and Rowan at Money in the Bank and Battleground. The Usos then dropped the titles to Goldust and Stardust at Night of Champions, ending their reign at 202 days.

On the December 29 edition of Raw, The Usos recaptured the titles from The Miz and Damien Mizdow after feuding with them over Naomi's entertainment opportunities. However, they lost the titles at Fastlane against Tyson Kidd and Cesaro. Despite getting a rematch the next night on Raw, The Usos did not regain the titles due to Natalya interfering for a DQ win. At the March 9 SmackDown tapings, Jey Uso suffered a legitimate shoulder injury. On the WrestleMania 31 pre-show, they competed in the fatal-four-way tag team match in which they lost and Jey further injuring his shoulder.

After Jey Uso suffered an anterior shoulder dislocation on the left arm, he remained off WWE television for about six months. On the April 18 episode of Main Event, Jimmy Uso defeated Xavier Woods. Jimmy performed commentary while Jey was out with the injury. On the May 12 episode of Main Event, Jimmy Uso teamed with Zack Ryder to face Luke Harper and Erick Rowan in a losing effort. Jimmy Uso returned to action on the September 10 episode of SmackDown, teaming with Roman Reigns and Dean Ambrose in a six-man tag team against The New Day (Big E, Kofi Kingston and Xavier Woods). They won via disqualification after Jimmy was attacked by The Wyatt Family (Bray Wyatt, Braun Strowman and Luke Harper).

Jey Uso returned on the November 2 episode of Raw alongside his brother Jimmy as a surprise return to team up with their cousin Roman Reigns, Dean Ambrose and Ryback against Seth Rollins, Kevin Owens and The New Day in a Survivor Series elimination tag team match, The Usos along with Reigns, Ambrose and Ryback were victorious in the match. On the November 30 episode of Raw, The Usos competed in a tag team #1 contenders match against Lucha Dragons, which ended in a double disqualification when The New Day attacked both teams. Later that night, Stephanie McMahon told The Usos that they would be inserted to the tag team championship match at the TLC pay-per-view if Roman Reigns defeated Sheamus during the main event of the show in 5 minutes and 15 seconds, which he won by disqualification. At TLC, The Usos competed in a losing effort. The Usos won a Slammy Award on the December 21 episode of Raw for "Tag Team of the year".

SmackDown Tag Team Champions (2016–2019) 
At the Royal Rumble, The Usos unsuccessfully challenged The New Day for the WWE Tag Team Championship. In February, The Usos entered a feud with Dudley Boyz after The Dudley Boyz put The Usos through tables after defeating The New Day and Mark Henry in an 8-man Tag team Tables match. On the WrestleMania 32 kickoff show, The Usos defeated The Dudley Boyz, but the next night on Raw, they were defeated by the Dudleys in tables match. On the April 11 episode of Raw, The Usos defeated The Social Outcasts in the first round of a tag team tournament. Following the match, they were attacked by Luke Gallows and Karl Anderson. The following week on Raw, The Usos lost to The Vaudevillains in the semi-final round. On the May 2 episode of Raw, The Usos and Roman Reigns were defeated by AJ Styles, Gallows and Anderson in a six-man tag team match when Styles pinned Jey Uso. At Extreme Rules, The Usos were defeated by Gallows and Anderson in a Texas Tornado match. Later that night, they helped Roman Reigns retain his title in the main event.

On July 19, at the 2016 WWE draft, The Usos were drafted to SmackDown working on both the Battleground and SummerSlam pre-shows. Then, they entered an 8 tag team tournament to determine the inaugural holders of the WWE SmackDown Tag Team Championship. On the September 6 episode of SmackDown, The Usos turned heel for the first time since 2011 when they attacked American Alpha after losing to them in 28 seconds in the semi-finals. At Backlash, The Usos defeated the Hype Bros before facing Heath Slater and Rhyno in the tournament finals, but were defeated. The Usos faced the new champions at No Mercy, where they were defeated again. As part of their heel turn, they began a street-like, thuggish gimmick. The Usos participated in a 5–on–5 Survivor Series Tag Team Elimination match at Survivor Series, where they lost to Cesaro and Sheamus of Team Raw. The Usos would reignite their feud with American Alpha following the Elimination Chamber after they attacked American Alpha.

On the March 21, 2017, episode of SmackDown, The Usos defeated American Alpha to win the SmackDown Tag Team Championship, becoming the first team to have won both the Raw (formerly WWE Tag Team Championship) and SmackDown Tag Team Championship. On the April 11 episode of SmackDown Live, The Usos were successful in their first title defense by defeating American Alpha in a rematch, ending the feud. They retained the titles at Backlash against Breezango (Tyler Breeze and Fandango) and Money in the Bank against The New Day, but lost them at Battleground to The New Day, ending their 124-day reign. On August 20 at the SummerSlam pre-show, The Usos defeated The New Day to recapture the titles. Their reign ended on the September 12 episode of SmackDown Live after they lost to The New Day in a Sin City Street Fight, but regained at Hell in a Cell. On the October 10 episode of SmackDown Live, The Usos claimed that they had respect for The New Day, turning into fan favorites again.

At Survivor Series, they defeated Raw Tag Team Champions Cesaro and Sheamus in an interbrand Champion vs Champion match. At Clash of Champions, The Usos retained the title in a fatal four-way tag team match against Chad Gable and Shelton Benjamin, The New Day (Big E and Kofi Kingston) and Rusev and Aiden English. At Royal Rumble, The Usos retained the titles against Gable and Benjamin in a two out of three falls match, winning 2–0. They would renew their rivalry with the New Day, culminating in a title match at Fastlane, which would end in a no-contest due to interference from The Bludgeon Brothers. At WrestleMania 34, The Usos wrestled on the main card of WrestleMania for the first time, where they defended the titles against The New Day and The Bludgeon Brothers in a triple threat tag team match, but The Usos dropped the belts to The Bludgeon Brothers after Harper pinned Kofi Kingston. This ended their reign at 182 days, setting a record for the longest SmackDown Tag Team Championship reign. On the SmackDown after WrestleMania, The Usos would defeat the New Day to earn a rematch against the Bludgeon Brothers for the WWE SmackDown Tag Team Championship at the Greatest Royal Rumble. At the event on April 27, The Usos were defeated when Rowan pinned Jey Uso.

On the May 22 episode of SmackDown, The Usos attempted to earn another title match at Money in the Bank, but were defeated by Luke Gallows and Karl Anderson. Following the loss, The Usos began failing to earn numerous title opportunities, including a tag team match against a returning Team Hell No (Daniel Bryan and Kane) on the July 3 episode of SmackDown and losing in the first round of a number one contender's tournament to The Bar (Cesaro and Sheamus) on the July 31 episode of SmackDown. After months of treading in the division, The Usos began to build momentum, starting with Survivor Series, where they, as Team SmackDown's captains, emerged from the 10-on-10 Survivor Series match as the sole survivors, giving SmackDown their only win over Raw. They would go on to challenge The Bar for the SmackDown Tag Team Championship in a triple threat match, which also included the New Day at TLC, but failed to capture the titles.

On the January 29, 2019, episode of SmackDown, they defeated The Bar, The New Day and new SmackDown tag team Heavy Machinery (Otis and Tucker) to get a SmackDown Tag Team Championship match at Elimination Chamber, where they defeated Shane McMahon and The Miz, winning the titles for a record fourth time. On the March 26 episode of SmackDown, The Usos were a part of a tag team gauntlet match in which they forfeited to former longtime rivals the New Day as a show of respect and to help Kofi Kingston earn a WWE Championship match at WrestleMania. As a storyline punishment for their deed, they were scheduled to defend the titles against The Bar, Aleister Black and Ricochet, and Shinsuke Nakamura and Rusev in a Fatal 4-Way at WrestleMania 35, where they would retain. Two days later, on the April 9 episode of SmackDown, The Usos lost the titles to Hardy Boyz.

As part of the 2019 WWE Superstar Shake-up, The Usos were drafted to the Raw brand. They entered a feud with The Revival (Dash Wilder and Scott Dawson) on Raw, while also entering a feud with Daniel Bryan and Rowan on SmackDown, thanks to WWE's new Wild Card Rule. On the May 7 episode of SmackDown Live, they failed to regain the SmackDown Tag Team Championship from Bryan and Rowan. At Money in the Bank, they defeated Bryan and Rowan in a non-title match. They proceed their feud with The Revival, where the two team would be trading wins with one another. On the June 10 episode of Raw, both The Usos and The Revival competed in a triple threat match for the Raw Tag Team Championship against champions Curt Hawkins and Zack Ryder, which The Revival won. At Extreme Rules, The Usos challenged The Revival for the titles, where they were unsuccessful. Following Jimmy's arrest for DUI, the duo would be off television for the remainder of the calendar year.

The Bloodline (2020–present) 

On the January 3, 2020 episode of SmackDown, The Usos returned once again as part of the SmackDown brand, aiding Roman Reigns from an attack by King Corbin and Dolph Ziggler. The Usos then challenged for the SmackDown Tag Team Championship at Elimination Chamber and WrestleMania 36, where they were unsuccessful again. During the match at WrestleMania, Jimmy suffered a legitimate knee injury, putting him out of in-ring action indefinitely.

On the September 4 episode of SmackDown, after Big E was attacked and injured in storyline, Jey took Big E's place in a fatal-four-way match against Matt Riddle, King Corbin, and Sheamus where the winner would earn a Universal Championship match at Clash of Champions against Roman Reigns, who turned heel recently. Jey won by pinning Riddle to earn the first singles championship opportunity of his career. He was defeated at Clash of Champions when Jimmy appeared and threw in a towel on Jey's behalf. Jey then a received a rematch at Hell in a Cell in an "I Quit" Hell in a Cell match but lost again. After Hell in a Cell, Jey aligned with Roman Reigns, thus turning heel in the process. On the April 9, 2021, special WrestleMania edition of SmackDown, Jey won the Andre the Giant Memorial Battle Royal. This marked Jey's first major singles accolade in WWE.

After Jimmy returned from injury on the May 7 episode of SmackDown, there was initial strife between The Usos and Reigns before they all reconciled and formed a faction. During the Money in the Bank Kickoff pre-show on July 18, The Usos were successful in capturing their fifth SmackDown Tag Team Championship from The Mysterios (Rey and Dominik). At SummerSlam, The Usos would defeat The Mysterios in a rematch to retain the titles.

On January 16, 2022, they broke their previous record of 182 days as longest reigning SmackDown Tag Team Champions. At WrestleMania 38, The Usos defeated Shinsuke Nakamura and Rick Boogs to retain their championship. At WrestleMania Backlash, The Usos and Reigns defeated RK-Bro (Randy Orton and Riddle) and Drew McIntyre in a six-man tag team match. On the May 20 episode of SmackDown, they, with outside interference from Reigns, defeated RK-Bro to win the Raw Tag Team Championship, becoming the Undisputed WWE Tag Team Champions. This gave The Usos their third reign as Raw Tag Team Champions (and first reign with the title since 2014) and made them the only team to hold the Raw and SmackDown titles simultaneously. At Money in the Bank, The Usos retained their undisputed titles against The Street Profits in controversial fashion, with The Usos winning by pinfall despite Montez Ford's shoulder being off the mat. A rematch between the teams was scheduled for SummerSlam with a special guest referee, later revealed to be Jeff Jarrett.

On July 18, The Usos surpassed the 365-day mark as SmackDown Tag Team Champions, becoming the first team to hold the titles for a continuous reign of one full year. At SummerSlam, The Usos successfully retained against The Street Profits. At Crown Jewel on November 5, The Usos successfully retained the titles against The Brawling Brutes (Butch and Ridge Holland). On the November 11 episode of SmackDown, they retained their championships against The New Day (Kofi Kingston and Xavier Woods), thus ensuring that they would become the longest reigning male tag team champions on WWE's main roster, a record previously set by The New Day at 483 days. On November 14, 2022, The Usos officially broke The New Day's record for main roster tag team championships, and then on November 28, they broke Gallus' record of 497 days with the NXT UK Tag Team Championship to become the longest reigning male tag team champions in WWE history, regardless of championship or roster status. At Survivor Series WarGames on November 26, The Bloodline (The Usos, Roman Reigns, Solo Sikoa and Sami Zayn) defeated The Brawling Brutes, Drew McIntyre and Kevin Owens in a WarGames match.

Tensions between The Usos and Zayn resurfaced in subsequent weeks. After Reigns retained the Undisputed WWE Universal Championship at the Royal Rumble against Kevin Owens, The Usos proceeded to beat down Owens and handcuff him to the ring ropes. After refusing to hit Owens, Zayn hit Reigns with a steel chair. Jimmy, Sikoa and Reigns attacked Zayn whilst Jey looked on and left the ring in disgust. After the event, Jey declared on Instagram that "[he's] out" and did not appear on the following episode of SmackDown. Jey would show up on the February 10 episode of SmackDown to retain the WWE Undisputed Tag Team Championship with Jimmy against Braun Strowman and Ricochet. Before the episode ended, Reigns, through Heyman, informed The Usos to stay at home for the following week's episode of SmackDown and Elimination Chamber in Canada. This was meant to write off The Usos as they may not be able to enter Canada due to their DUI history, where DUI charges are taken more seriously there. However, they would be present for the event to assist Reigns in retaining his championship. 

On the March 6 episode of Raw, Jey showed up in the crowd during Jimmy's match against Zayn which Jimmy lost. Following the match, Jey appeared to hug Zayn before superkicking him, signaling Jey's allegiance to The Bloodline. The Usos and Sikoa assaulted Zayn before Cody Rhodes ran out to save Zayn.

Other media 
The pair starred in the first episode of Outside the Ring, where they cooked a traditional Samoan barbecue.

Together, The Usos made their video game debut in WWE '13 as downloadable content. The Usos were not in WWE 2K14 but returned in WWE 2K15, and have continued to appear in WWE 2K16, WWE 2K17, WWE 2K18, WWE 2K19, WWE 2K20, and WWE 2K22. They also appeared uncredited in Countdown with Dolph Ziggler, Roman Reigns, and Big Show, as well as the animated film The Jetsons & WWE: Robo-WrestleMania!, which they play a role as Usobots, remaining in the same role.

Jimmy is regularly featured in the reality television series Total Divas due to his marriage with Total Divas star Naomi. Jey has also made brief appearances. Jimmy has also appeared in his wife's music video for her song "Dance All Night", which was put on WWE's YouTube channel.

The brothers are regularly featured on Xavier Woods' YouTube channel UpUpDownDown, where Jimmy goes by the nickname 'Uce' and Jey goes by the nickname 'Jucey'. In May 2019, Jimmy unsuccessfully challenged Kofi Kingston in a game of ClayFighter for Kingston's UpUpDownDown Championship. A month later, Jey challenged Kingston for the title in a game of Tetris, where Jey defeated Kingston to win the championship. Jimmy would then defeat Jey in a two-out-of-three game of The King of Fighters XIV to win the championship. He lost the title to Samoa Joe in a game of World Heroes.

After being named the number one contender for the WWE Universal Championship in September 2020, Jey Uso was featured on an episode of the WWE Network mini documentary series WWE Chronicle.

Personal lives 
The Fatu brothers are of Samoan descent. As the sons of WWE Hall of Famer Solofa Fatu Jr. (Rikishi), they are also part of the Anoaʻi family; they are first cousins once-removed from current and former WWE performers Afa Anoa'i Jr. (Manu), Samula Anoaʻi (Samu), the late Matt Anoaʻi (Rosey), Joe Anoaʻi (Roman Reigns), Sean Maluta, the late WWE Hall of Famer Rodney Anoaʻi (Yokozuna), and Lance Anoa'i, as well as Jacob Fatu who currently performs for Major League Wrestling (MLW) but has never performed in WWE. They are also the nephews of Sam Fatu (The Tonga Kid), the late Eddie Fatu (Umaga), Afa Anoa'i and Sika Anoa'i. Their brother, Joseph "Sefa" Fatu, also performs in WWE under the ring name Solo Sikoa; he has performed in NXT 2.0 and made his main roster debut on SmackDown on September 9, 2022. They are also related through a blood brotherhood between their great-grandfather Reverend Amituana'i Anoa'i, Pita (Peter) Maivia, James (Jimmy) Snuka, James Reiher-Snuka (Deuce) Sarona Snuka Polamalu (Tamina), and Dwayne Johnson (The Rock). Their stage name "uso" means "brother" in the Samoan language. From 2011 to 2016, they performed the Samoan Siva Tau before their matches.

Jonathan married fellow wrestler and longtime girlfriend Trinity McCray (Naomi) on January 16, 2014. She is also the stepmother of Jonathan's two children, Jayla and Jaidan.

Joshua married his wife Takecia Travis in 2015. They have two sons together.

Legal issues 
Jonathan Fatu was arrested on September 29, 2011, in Hillsborough County, Florida and charged with DUI. A police officer observed Fatu at around 3 A.M. EDT driving the wrong way down a one way street. The officer pulled Fatu over and gave him a field sobriety test, which Fatu failed. Fatu was also given a breathalyzer and blew a .18, twice the legal limit in the state of Florida. Fatu was convicted and sentenced to probation. On March 13, 2013, Fatu was arrested for violating his probation by driving with a suspended license.

Joshua Fatu was arrested in January 2018 for DWI in Hidalgo County, Texas after performing at a WWE live event held at Hidalgo's Payne Arena. He was released the same day after posting a $500 personal recognizance bond.

On February 14, 2019, Jonathan Fatu was arrested in Detroit, Michigan following a dispute with police officers when he, Joshua, and Trinity Fatu's Dodge Journey rental vehicle were pulled over when driving the wrong way on a one-way street. Police claim that when they approached the vehicle, they could smell alcohol from the inside. Officers then requested Trinity, the driver, to exit the SUV so that they could speak with her. Officers then claimed that Jonathan Fatu, Trinity's spouse, exited the vehicle while officers were speaking to Trinity and removed his shirt, then proceeded to walk towards the officers, prompting one of the officers to pull out his taser. The situation was quickly calmed down, however, and Fatu was placed under arrest and charged with disorderly conduct and obstruction of justice. In March 2019, it was revealed that Fatu's attorney struck a plea deal with prosecutors, and as per the condition of the agreement, Fatu pleaded no contest to interfering with a government employee and he was ordered to pay a $450 fine.

In the early morning hours of July 25, 2019, Jonathan Fatu was again arrested, this time near Pensacola, Florida, and was charged with DUI. He was taken into custody and booked into the Escambia County corrections center at approximately 3:00 A.M. CDT. Fatu was later released from custody on $1,000 bond and was due to appear in court on August 15.  Fatu was found not guilty by an Escambia county jury on the DUI charge after a trial that concluded on December 18, 2019.

On July 5, 2021, Jonathan Fatu was arrested after being pulled over at approximately 10:35 P.M. CDT in Pensacola. Officers claim Fatu ran a red light after they clocked him going 50 MPH in a 35 MPH zone. They administered a breathalyzer and Fatu's BAC came back at .202 and .205, well above Florida's legal limit of .08. Fatu was booked on a misdemeanor DUI charge along with citations for speeding and running a red light. Bond was set at $500.

As a result of the charges, both brothers have been generally barred from entering Canada; they were given special permission to enter the country in February 2023 for the Elimination Chamber event in Montreal.

Championships and accomplishments 

 CBS Sports
 Feud of the Year (2020) 
 Tag Team of the Year (2018)
 ESPN
 Best storyline of the year (2022) – 
 Tag team of the year (2022)
 Florida Championship Wrestling
 FCW Florida Tag Team Championship (1 time)
 Pro Wrestling Illustrated
 Faction of the Year (2022) – with The Bloodline
 Tag Team of the Year (2014)
 Ranked Jimmy No. 25 of the top 500 singles wrestlers in the PWI 500 in 2014
 Ranked Jey No. 26 of the top 500 singles wrestlers in the PWI 500 in 2014
 Ranked No. 1 of the top 50 Tag Teams in the PWI Tag Team 50 in 2022
 Rolling Stone
 Tag Team of the Year (2017)
 WWE
 WWE Raw Tag Team Championship (3 times, current)
 WWE SmackDown Tag Team Championship (5 times, current)
 André the Giant Memorial Battle Royal (2021) – Jey Uso
 Slammy Award (2 times)
 Tag Team of the Year (2014, 2015)

Notes

References

External links 

 
 

1985 births
American male professional wrestlers
American people of Samoan descent
American professional wrestlers of Samoan descent
Anoa'i family
Living people
Professional wrestlers from California
Sportspeople from San Francisco
American twins
Twin performers
West Alabama Tigers football players
WWE teams and stables